The 178th New York State Legislature, consisting of the New York State Senate and the New York State Assembly, met from January 8, 1969, to April 20, 1970, during the eleventh and twelfth years of Nelson Rockefeller's governorship, in Albany.

Background
Under the provisions of the New York Constitution of 1938, and the U.S. Supreme Court decision to follow the One man, one vote rule, re-apportioned in 1966 by order of the New York Court of Appeals, 57 Senators and 150 assemblymen were elected in single-seat districts for two-year terms. Senate and Assembly districts consisted of approximately the same number of inhabitants, the area being apportioned without restrictions regarding county boundaries.

At this time there were two major political parties: the Republican Party and the Democratic Party. The Conservative Party, the Liberal Party, the Peace and Freedom Party, the Socialist Labor Party and the Socialist Workers Party also nominated tickets.

Elections
The New York state election, 1968, was held on November 5. The only two statewide elective offices up for election were a seat on the New York Court of Appeals and a U.S. Senator from New York. The incumbent office-holders were re-elected: Judge Adrian P. Burke, a Democrat with Republican, Liberal and Conservative endorsement; and U.S. Senator Jacob K. Javits, a Republican with Liberal endorsement. The approximate party strength at this election, as expressed by the vote for U.S. Senator, was: Republicans/Liberals 3,270,000; Democrats 2,151,000; Conservatives 1,139,000; Peace and Freedom 9,000; Socialist Labor 8,000; and Socialist Workers 5,000.

Two of the four women members of the previous legislature—Assemblywomen Constance E. Cook (Rep.), a lawyer of Ithaca; and Gail Hellenbrand (Dem.), of Brooklyn—were re-elected. Rosemary R. Gunning (Cons.), a lawyer of Ridgewood, Queens; and Mary Anne Krupsak (Dem.), a lawyer of Amsterdam, were also elected to the Assembly.

The New York state election, 1969, was held on November 4. The only statewide elective office up for election was a seat on the New York Court of Appeals. Two vacancies in the Assembly were filled.

Sessions
The Legislature met for the first regular session (the 192nd) at the State Capitol in Albany on January 8, 1969; and recessed on March 30. The Legislature met again on April 15; and adjourned sine die on May 2.

Perry B. Duryea, Jr. (Rep.) was elected Speaker.

Earl W. Brydges (Rep.) was re-elected Temporary President of the State Senate.

On March 28, the Legislature increased the state sales tax by 1 percentage point. Democrats Charles F. Stockmeister and Albert J. Hausbeck voted with the Republicans and subsequently were ostracised by their party. Stockmeister was appointed by Gov. Rockefeller to the Civil Service Commission on July 3, 1969. Hausbeck changed parties in 1970, and was re-elected to the Assembly on the Republican and Conservative tickets in November 1970.

On December 3, 1969, the Court of Appeals did not allow a re-apportionment of the legislative districts which the Republican majorities in both Houses intended to enact in time to be used for the elections in November 1970.

The Legislature met for the second regular session (the 193rd) at the State Capitol in Albany on January 7, 1970; and adjourned sine die on April 20.

On April 9, 1970, the Assembly passed a bill allowing abortion without restrictions until 24 weeks of pregnancy. The Senate passed the bill on April 10, and Gov. Rockefeller signed it on April 11, thus becoming the law.

State Senate

Senators
The asterisk (*) denotes members of the previous Legislature who continued in office as members of this Legislature. Jess J. Present changed from the Assembly to the Senate at the beginning of the session.

Note: For brevity, the chairmanships omit the words "...the Committee on (the)..."

Employees
 Secretary: Albert J. Abrams

State Assembly

Assembly members
The asterisk (*) denotes members of the previous Legislature who continued in office as members of this Legislature.

Note: For brevity, the chairmanships omit the words "...the Committee on (the)..."

Employees
 Clerk: Donald A. Campbell

Notes

Sources
 Assembly winners and Senate leaders in The Geneva Times, of Geneva, on November 6, 1968

178
1969 in New York (state)
1970 in New York (state)
1969 U.S. legislative sessions
1970 U.S. legislative sessions